

Hermann Ritter von Speck (8 August 1888 – 15 June 1940) was a German general during World War II. He was a recipient of the Knight's Cross of the Iron Cross of Nazi Germany. Speck was killed by French machine gun fire on 15 June 1940 in Pont-sur-Yonne, France.

He was posthumously awarded the Knight's Cross of the Iron Cross on 17 October 1940.

In 2010, Jay Nordlinger spoke with von Speck's daughter, who claimed that the general deliberately sought death in battle: "According to his daughter, he wanted to die, and arranged to die. He felt he could not break his oath to the army — he could not desert. And his Catholic faith prevented him from committing suicide — suicide straight out, you might say. So, he put himself in the line of fire. In his dying words, he did not say, 'Give my love to my family', or anything like that. He said, 'It had to be this way'.”

Awards and decorations

 Knight's Cross of the Iron Cross on 17 October 1940 as Generalleutnant and commander of XVIII. Armeekorps

References

Citations

Bibliography

 

1888 births
1940 deaths
German Army generals of World War II
Generals of Artillery (Wehrmacht)
German Army personnel of World War I
Military personnel from Munich
Knights of the Military Order of Max Joseph
Recipients of the clasp to the Iron Cross, 1st class
Recipients of the Knight's Cross of the Iron Cross
German Army personnel killed in World War II
People from the Kingdom of Bavaria